In human anatomy of the arm, the capitulum of the humerus is a smooth, rounded eminence on the lateral portion of the distal articular surface of the humerus. It articulates with the cupshaped depression on the head of the radius, and is limited to the front and lower part of the bone.

In non-human tetrapods, the name capitellum is generally used, with "capitulum" limited to the anteroventral articular facet of the rib (in archosauromorphs).

Lepidosauromorpha

Lepidosaurs show a distinct capitellum and trochlea on the centre of the ventral (anterior in upright taxa) surface of the humerus at the distal end.

Archosauromorpha

In non-avian archosaurs, including crocodiles, the capitellum and the trochlea are no longer bordered by distinct etc.- and entepicondyles respectively, and the distal humerus consists two gently expanded condyles, one lateral and one medial, separated by a shallow groove and a supinator process. Romer (1976) homologizes the capitellum in Archosauromorphs with the groove separating the medial and lateral condyles.

In birds, where forelimb anatomy has an adaptation for flight, its functional if not ontogenetic equivalent is the dorsal condyle of the humerus.

Additional images

References

 Romer, A.S. 1976 Osteology of the reptiles. University of Chicago Press, Chicago.

External links
 
  BiowebUW, cached at archive.org

Humerus